Derek Kelsall was an English multihull sailboat designer latterly resident in New Zealand.

Designs
A partial list of Kelsall's designs follows.
Toria (1966)
Trifle (late 1960s)

References

Multihull designers
Year of birth missing (living people)
Living people
Place of birth missing (living people)